Ruslan Khadarkevich (born 18 June 1993) is a Belarusian professional footballer who plays for Dinamo Minsk.

International career
He was first called up to the Belarus national football team in November 2020 for UEFA Nations League games. He made his debut on 2 June 2021 in a friendly against Azerbaijan.

Honours
Shakhtyor Soligorsk
Belarusian Premier League champion: 2020, 2021, 2022
Belarusian Super Cup winner: 2021

References

External links 
 
 

1993 births
Living people
Footballers from Minsk
Belarusian footballers
Belarus international footballers
Association football defenders
FC Bereza-2010 players
FC Slavia Mozyr players
FC Smolevichi players
FC Shakhtyor Soligorsk players
FC Dinamo Minsk players